Fellini Só Vive 2 Vezes (Portuguese for Fellini Only Lives Twice) is the second studio album by Brazilian post-punk band Fellini. It was released in 1986 by Baratos Afins and re-released in CD form in 1995.

Guitarist Jair Marcos and drummer Ricardo Salvagni could not play for this album due to personal reasons, thus only vocalist Cadão Volpato and bassist/multi-instrumentalist Thomas Pappon took part on the album's recording, that happened in a small studio in Pappon's house.

The album's front cover was illustrated by Cadão Volpato.

A music video was made for the track "Burros e Oceanos"; however, it was never broadcast and is now lost.

Track listing

Personnel
Fellini
 Cadão Volpato — lead vocals
 Thomas Pappon — all instruments, backing vocals

Miscellaneous staff
 Recorded a 4-channel studio door on January 86 and mixed in March at Vice Versa Studio, São Paulo sound engineer Nico Bloise
 Tamara Keller — photography
 Pappon, Volpato and Walter Silva — cover (final art)
 Signore Volpato — drawing
 Luiz Carlos Calanca, Thomas Pappon and Cadão Volpato — production
 Luiz Carlos Calanca and Paulo Torres — remastering (cd version)
 Thank you Tancred
 This album is dedicated a Ricardo Salvagni, Jayr Marcos and Bia Abramo
 One production Baratos Afins

References

External links
 Fellini Só Vive 2 Vezes at Fellini's official Bandcamp
 Fellini Só Vive 2 Vezes at Deezer
 Fellini on Baratos Afins' website 
 Fellini Só Vive 2 Vezes at Discogs
 Fellini Só vive 2 Vezes at Rate Your Music
 Fellini So Vive 2 Vezes at MusicBrainz

1986 albums
Fellini (band) albums
Portuguese-language albums